Moorland is a home rule-class city in Jefferson County, Kentucky, United States. The population was 431 as of the 2010 census.

Geography
Moorland is located in northeastern Jefferson County at  (38.273020, -85.579048). It is bordered to the south, east, and west by Lyndon, and to the north by consolidated Louisville/Jefferson County.

Demographics

At the 2000 census there were 464 people in 206 households, including 127 families, in the city. The racial makeup of the city was 91.81% White, 4.74% African American, 0.43% Asian, 0.22% from other races, and 2.80% from two or more races. Hispanic or Latino of any race were 0.65%.

Of the 206 households 29.1% had children under the age of 18 living with them, 44.2% were married couples living together, 13.1% had a female householder with no husband present, and 38.3% were non-families. 32.5% of households were one person and 4.4% were one person aged 65 or older. The average household size was 2.25 and the average family size was 2.85.

The age distribution was 24.1% under the age of 18, 5.8% from 18 to 24, 38.4% from 25 to 44, 24.4% from 45 to 64, and 7.3% 65 or older. The median age was 36 years. For every 100 females, there were 100.9 males. For every 100 females age 18 and over, there were 90.3 males.

The median household income was $40,469 and the median family income  was $45,096. Males had a median income of $35,625 versus $25,625 for females. The per capita income for the city was $18,092. About 1.4% of families and 1.6% of the population were below the poverty line, including 1.6% of those under age 18 and none of those age 65 or over.

References

Cities in Kentucky
Cities in Jefferson County, Kentucky
Louisville metropolitan area
Populated places established in 1959
1959 establishments in Kentucky